The following is a list of events affecting Tamil language television in 2020 from (India (Tamil Nadu), Sri Lanka, Singapore, Malaysia and Tamil diaspora). Events listed include television show debuts, and finales; channel launches, and closures; stations changing or adding their network affiliations; and information about changes of ownership of channels or stations.

Events and New channels

January

October

Debut Series and Shows

Soap Operas

Shows

Debut Web Series

Ending Series and Shows

Cancel Shows

Deaths

References

2020 in Tamil-language television